Earl Gentry "Ken" Kendrick, Jr. (born September 2, 1943) is an American businessman who is the principal owner and managing general partner of the National League's Arizona Diamondbacks. He became part-owner with the team's inception in 1995. He has been managing general partner since 2004, overseeing day-to-day operations and acting as the organization’s designated representative when the Major League Baseball owners convene. Prior to his position with the team, Kendrick founded Datatel, Inc., a software development company, and served as a banking industry executive in Texas. He has a net worth of $1 billion as of June 2022.

Diamondbacks tenure
During his tenure, the D-backs have twice captured the National League West Division (2007, ‘11), reaching the NLCS for just the second time in the franchise’s existence in 2007. Under Kendrick’s leadership, through equity and debt restructures, the team has eliminated more than $200 million of debt.

After leading negotiations on the team's multi-billion dollar television rights deal with FOX Sports Arizona, Kendrick authorized the D-backs to sign pitcher Zack Greinke to a six-year deal with the largest annual average value in Major League Baseball history.

During Kendrick's time as Managing General Partner, the Diamondbacks have hosted an All-Star Game at Chase Field in 2011, and opened a Spring Training facility that is widely considered the finest in all of baseball in Salt River Fields at Talking Stick.

In 2013, ESPN the Magazine rated the D-backs as the No. 6 team in Major League Baseball in its Ultimate Standings, which gauges success both on and off the field  and Yahoo! has referred to the Arizona Diamondbacks as the "best workplace in sports."

Personal life 
In politics, Kendrick and his wife Randy have made donations to conservative groups connected with the Koch brothers. Kendrick and his wife raised funds for Marco Rubio during the 2016 Republican primaries. According to FEC filings, he has donated to many candidates who have challenged the 2020 U.S. Presidential Election, including Arizona U.S. Congressman Paul Gosar and Andy Biggs. He also donated money to Colorado U.S. Congresswoman Lauren Boebert.  

As of 2016, Kendrick is the owner of the T206 Honus Wagner baseball card once owned by Wayne Gretzky, considered the most valuable trading card in the world. The Wagner card and 34 other iconic and rare baseball cards in Kendrick’s collection, titled "The D-backs Collection," were previously displayed at the National Baseball Hall of Fame and Museum in Cooperstown, N.Y.

References

External links
 List of Arizona Diamondbacks owners 
 Kendrick's bio on WVU alumni website

Major League Baseball owners
Living people
West Virginia University alumni
Arizona Diamondbacks owners
People from Princeton, West Virginia
1943 births
American billionaires